The Book of Disquiet is a work by the Portuguese author Fernando Pessoa (1888–1935). Published posthumously, The Book of Disquiet is a fragmentary lifetime project, left unedited by the author, who introduced it as a "factless autobiography."
The publication was credited to Bernardo Soares, one of the author's alternate writing names, which he called semi-heteronyms, and had a preface attributed to Fernando Pessoa, another alternate writing name or orthonym.

Editions 

Much studied by "Pessoan" critics, who have different interpretations regarding the book's proper organization, The Book of Disquiet was first published in Portuguese in 1982, 47 years after Pessoa's death (the author died at age 47 in 1935). The book has seen publication in Spanish (1984), German (1985), Italian (1986), French (1988), English (1991), Dutch (1990 (selection), and 1998 (full)). The Book in 1991 had four English editions by different translators: Richard Zenith (editor and translator), Iain Watson, Alfred MacAdam, and Margaret Jull Costa. The Book is a bestseller, especially in Spanish, Italian, and German (from different translators and publishers).

The book appeared on the Norwegian Book Club's list of the all-time 100 best works of literature, based on the responses of 100 authors from 54 countries.

Interpretations

Teresa Sobral Cunha considers there to be two versions of The Book of Disquiet. According to Cunha, who edited the first version with Jacinto do Prado Coelho and Maria Aliete Galhoz in 1982, there are two authors of the book: Vicente Guedes in the first phase (in the 1910s and 20s), and the aforementioned Bernardo Soares (late 1920s and 30s).

However, António Quadros considers the first phase of the book to belong to Pessoa himself. The second phase, more personal and diary-like, is the one credited to Bernardo Soares.

Richard Zenith, editor of a new Portuguese edition in 1998, took the option of presenting a single volume, as in his English translation of 1991. In his introduction, he writes that "if Bernardo Soares does not measure up to the full Pessoa, neither are his diary writings the sum total of Disquietude, to which he was after all a johnny-come-lately. The Book of Disquietude was various books (yet ultimately one book), with various authors (yet ultimately one author), and even the word disquietude changes meaning as time passes."

Translations into English
 The Book of Disquiet, tr. Alfred Mac Adam (New York: Pantheon Books, 1991, 276 p.).
 The Book of Disquiet, tr. Margaret Jull Costa (London, New York: Serpent's Tail, 1991, 262 p.). Based on the 1986 Feltrinelli edition, edited by Maria José de Lancastre.
 The Book of Disquiet, tr. Richard Zenith (London: Allen Lane, 2001, 508 p.). Based on the 1998 Assírio & Alvim edition, edited by Richard Zenith.
 The Book of Disquiet: A Selection, tr. Iain Watson (London: Quartet Books, 1991, 195 p.).
The Book of Disquiet: The Complete Edition, tr. Margaret Jull Costa (New York: New Directions, 2017, 488 p.). Based on the 2013 Tinta-da-china edition, edited by Jerónimo Pizarro.
 The Book of Disquietude, tr. Richard Zenith (Manchester: Carcanet Press, 1991, 323 p.). Based on the 1982 Edições Ática edition, edited by Jacinto do Prado Coelho.

References

Further reading
 AARON, "A Futile Attempt To Review The Book of Disquiet", Alpha Gamma, 31 May 2018. 
 Eddie Grace, "Quarantine Reads: The Book of Disquiet", The Paris Review, 15 April 2020.
 Jonathan McAloon, "Books to give you hope: The Book of Disquiet by Fernando Pessoa", The Guardian, 30 August 2016.
 Michael Kimmelman "Portugal Holds on to Words Few Can Grasp", New York Times, 15 July 2008.
 Saudade
 Scott Esposito and Bradley Babendir, "‘The Book of Disquiet’ Is the Weirdest Autobiography Ever", Electric Literature, 26 September 2017.

Videos 
 Fernando Pessoa – The Book of Disquiet BOOK REVIEW 17:19
 The Book of Disquiet - Fernando Pessoa - Book Review 31:44
 The Book of Disquiet by Fernando Pessoa - Book Chat 08:58
 The Book of Disquiet by Fernando Pessoa - Book Chat 14:06
 Two Month Review s06e01: Pessoa's The Book of Disquiet with Declan Spring! 43:35

1982 books
Works published under a pseudonym
Portuguese books
Books published posthumously
Books about emotions
Modernist novels
Fernando Pessoa